Ghana competed at the 1992 Summer Olympics in Barcelona, Spain.

Medalists

Competitors
The following is the list of number of competitors in the Games.

Results by event

Athletics
Men's Triple Jump
Francis Dodoo 
 Qualification — did not finish (→ did not advance)

Boxing
Men's Light Flyweight (– 48 kg)
 Stephen Ahialey
 First Round – Bye
 Second Round – Lost to Rowan Williams (GBR), 3:11

Football

Men
First Round (Group D)

Group D

Quarter-finals

Semi-finals

Bronze medal game

References

Nations at the 1992 Summer Olympics
1992
Olympics